The Deaf European records in swimming are the fastest ever performances of deaf athletes, which are recognised and ratified by the International Committee of Sports for the Deaf (ICSD) and FINA.

Short Course (25 m)

Men

Women

See also
List of World Deaf Swimming Championships records
List of deaf world records in athletics

References

European athletics records
European records
Athletics in Europe